Calamarata is a kind of thick ring pasta, often dyed with black squid ink to resemble sliced calamari. It originates from Naples. Calamaretti is the smaller variant of calamarata.

See also
 List of pasta

References

Types of pasta
Cuisine of Sicily
Neapolitan cuisine